Bukit Pasir is a state constituency in Johor, Malaysia, that has been represented in the Johor State Legislative Assembly.

History

Polling districts
According to the federal gazette issued on 30 March 2018, the Bukit Pasir constituency is divided into 20 polling districts.

Representation history

Election results

References 

Johor state constituencies
Muar District